Balataea is a genus of butterflies belonging to the family Zygaenidae.

The genus was first described by Walker in 1864.

The species of this genus are found in Japan.

Species:
 Balataea octomaculata Bremer, 1861

References

Zygaenidae
Zygaenidae genera